The desperate shrew (Crocidura desperata) is a species of mammal in the family Soricidae. It is endemic to Tanzania.  Its natural habitat is subtropical or tropical moist montane forests.

Sources

Mammals of Tanzania
Endemic fauna of Tanzania
Crocidura
Mammals described in 1991
Taxonomy articles created by Polbot